This is a list of universities in Yerevan, the capital of Armenia.

State universities
As of 2022, Yerevan has 23 state universities:
 Yerevan State University (1919)
 National University of Architecture and Construction of Armenia (1921)
 Yerevan State Medical University (1922)
 Armenian State Pedagogical University named after Khachatur Abovian (1922)
 Komitas State Conservatory of Yerevan (1923)
 Armenian National Agrarian University (1930)
 National Polytechnic University of Armenia (1933)
 Yerevan Brusov State University of Languages and Social Sciences (1935)
 Yerevan State Institute of Theatre and Cinematography (1944)
 Armenian State Institute of Physical Culture and Sport (1945)
 Yerevan State Academy of Fine Arts (1946)
 Armenian State University of Economics (1975)
 American University of Armenia (1991)
 Crisis Management State Academy (1992)
 Marshal Armenak Khanperyants Military Aviation University (1992)
 Public Administration Academy of Armenia (1994)
 Vazgen Sargsyan Military University (1994)
 Fondation Université Française en Arménie (1995)
 International Scientific-Educational Center of the National Academy of Sciences of Armenia (postgraduate) (1997)
 Russian-Armenian University (1997)
 European University of Armenia (postgraduate) (2001)
 National Defense Research University (2005)
 Academy of the Police Educational Complex of Armenia (2011)

Branches of foreign public universities
As of 2018, Yerevan has 5 branches of foreign public universities:
 Plekhanov Russian University of Economics, Yerevan Branch (1999)
 Ternopil National Economic University Scientific-Educational Centre in Yerevan (2001)
 Russian State University of Tourism and Services Studies, Yerevan Branch (2001)
 Armenian Institute for Tourism, Yerevan Branch of the Russian International Academy for Tourism (RIAT) (2002)
 M.V. Lomonosov Moscow State University, Yerevan Branch (2015)

Private
As of 2020, Yerevan has 21 private universities:
Yerevan
 Galick University (1989)
 Haybusak University of Yerevan (1990)
 Yerevan Gladzor University (1990)
 Yerevan Mesrop Mashtots University (1990)
 MFB Academy of Finance (1990)
 Armenian Medical Institute (1990)
 University of Economy and Law named after Avetik Mkrtchyan (1990)
 Urartu University of Practical Psychology and Sociology (1991)
 University of Traditional Medicine (1991)
 University of International Economic Relations (1991)
 Yerevan Agricultural University (1992)
 Medical University named after Saint Teresa (1992)
 Azpat-Veteran Institute of Forensic Science and Psychology (1992)
 Anania Shirakatsi University of International Relations (1994)
 National Academy of Fine Arts (1995)
 Eurasia International University (1996)
 Northern University of Yerevan (1996)
 Yerevan University of Management (1996)
 Movses Khorenatsy University (1996)
 Yerevan Culture University (1996)
 International Accountancy Training Center (postgraduate) (1998)

See also
Armenian-language schools outside Armenia
Education in Armenia
List of universities in Armenia
List of universities in Artsakh

References

External links 
Armenia university, college and institute directory at www.university-directory.eu

Yerevan
Universities